The Great Patriotic War is a term used in Russia and some other former republics of the Soviet Union to describe the conflict fought during the period from 22 June 1941 to 9 May 1945 along the many fronts of the Eastern Front of World War II, primarily between the Soviet Union and Nazi Germany. For some legal purposes, this period may be extended to 11 May 1945 to include the end of the Prague offensive.

The end of the Great Patriotic War is commemorated on 9 May.

History 
The term "Patriotic War" refers to the Russian resistance to the French invasion of Russia under Napoleon I, which became known as the Patriotic War of 1812. In Russian, the term  originally referred to a war on one's own territory ( means "the fatherland"), as opposed to a campaign abroad, and later was reinterpreted as a war  the fatherland, i.e. a defensive war for one's homeland. Sometimes the Patriotic War of 1812 was also referred to as the Great Patriotic War; the phrase first appeared in 1844 and became popular on the eve of the centenary of the Patriotic War of 1812.

After 1914, the phrase was applied to World War I. It was the name of a special war-time appendix to the magazine Theater and Life in Saint Petersburg, and referred to the Eastern Front of World War I, where Russia fought against the German Empire and the Austro-Hungarian Empire. The phrases Second Patriotic War and Great World Patriotic War were also used during World War I in Russia.

The term Great Patriotic War re-appeared in the Soviet newspaper Pravda on 23 June 1941, just a day after Nazi Germany invaded the Soviet Union. It was found in the title of "The Great Patriotic War of the Soviet People", a long article by Yemelyan Yaroslavsky, a member of Pravda editors' collegium. The phrase was intended to motivate the population to defend the Soviet fatherland and to expel the invader, and a reference to the Patriotic War of 1812 was seen as a great morale booster.

The term  (Patriotic War or Fatherland War) was officially recognized by establishment of the Order of the Patriotic War on 20 May 1942, awarded for heroic deeds.

Usage 
The term is not generally used outside the former Soviet Union, and the closest term is the Eastern Front of World War II (1941–1945). Neither term covers the initial phase of World War II in Eastern Europe, during which the USSR, then still in a "non-aggression pact" with Germany, invaded eastern Poland (1939), the Baltic states (1940), Bessarabia and Northern Bukovina (1940) and Finland (1939–1940). The term also does not cover the Soviet–Japanese War (1945).

In Russia and some other post-Soviet countries, the term is given great significance; it is accepted as a representation of the most important part of WWII. Until 2014, Uzbekistan was the only nation in the Commonwealth of Independent States that does not recognize the term, referring to it as World War II as well as the Victory Day on May 9 as the state holiday - the Day of Remembrance and Honour.

On 9 April 2015, the Ukrainian parliament replaced the term "Great Patriotic War" (Velyka vitchyzniana viina) in the country's law with the "Second World War" (Druha svitova viina), as part of a set of decommunization laws. Also in 2015, Ukraine's "Victory Day over Nazism in World War II" was established as a national holiday in accordance with the law of "On Perpetuation of Victory over Nazism in World War II 1939-1945". The new holiday is celebrated on May 8 and replaces the Soviet-Russian Victory Day, which is celebrated on May 9. These laws were adopted by parliament on April 9, 2015 within the package of laws on decommunization.

See also 

 Operation Barbarossa
 Pobediteli
 Pobedobesie
 Strategic operations of the Red Army in World War II

Notes

References

External links 

 Great Patriotic War of the Soviet Union 1941-1945. A General Outline, English-language book published in the Soviet Union in 1974.
 Documentary films and newsreels about the Great Patriotic War 
 Poems about the Great Patriotic War
 Bryan Fugate, Operation Barbarossa: Strategy And Tactics On The Eastern Front, 1941

 
Russian words and phrases
Propaganda in the Soviet Union